Semagystia wernerithomasi is a moth in the family Cossidae. It was described by Yakovlev in 2007. It is found in Afghanistan and Kazakhstan.

The length of the forewings is about 13 mm. The forewings are greyish with a light-brown border, brownish at the veins and yellowish between them. The hindwings are dark-brown with a narrow dark marginal border and a very narrow light streak.

References

Natural History Museum Lepidoptera generic names catalog

Cossinae
Moths described in 2007